Amphicrossus ciliatus is a species of sap-feeding beetle in the family Nitidulidae. It is found in the Caribbean Sea, Central America, and North America.

References

Further reading

External links

 

Nitidulidae
Articles created by Qbugbot
Beetles described in 1811